The city flag of Philadelphia is a blue and yellow triband, featuring the Seal of Philadelphia.

Flag

The flag of Philadelphia was officially adopted by city ordinance on March 27, 1895 and is the municipal flag of the city of Philadelphia, Pennsylvania. The flag is a yellow-on-blue bicolor vertical triband defaced with the seal of the city; the Philadelphia City Code defines the flag as "divided vertically in 3 equal parts, of which the first and third shall be azure blue and the middle pale golden yellow" with the city seal on the center of the yellow stripe; flags displayed by entities other than the municipal government often omit the seal.  The dimensions of the flag are "10 feet long and 6 feet wide, or similar proportions". Official but seldom seen variations include a Merchant Flag, Pennant, and Streamer.  The blue and yellow colors commemorate the original Swedish colonization of Philadelphia. One flag manufacturer who supplies flags to the city government stated that the shade of blue used is "UN Blue" (the same shade used in the United Nations flag).

Coat of Arms

The current version of the coat of arms was designed mainly by Colonel Frank Marx and adopted by City Council on February 14, 1874. According to the City Code, the city seal is "ARMS -- On a blue field, a fess golden between a plough above and a ship in full sail below; both proper. CREST -- A right arm, nude, embowed, couped at shoulder, holding a pair of scales; all proper. SUPPORTERS -- Two females, standing full face, the one on the left side of the shield habited white and purple, crowned with an olive wreath; in her right hand a scroll, charged with an anchor; all proper; the one on the right side habited white and blue; in her left hand a cornucopia, proper. MOTTO -- PHILADELPHIA MANETO."

Four guiding principles of the City are found on the flag: peace, hope, abundance, and justice. The figure on the left with the olive wreath and scroll with anchor signifies peace and hope respectively. The figure on the right with cornucopia symbolizes abundance or prosperity. Above the shield appears a bent arm, holding the scales of justice and mercy.

See also

Philadelphia Eagles#Logo and uniforms (in seventh paragraph, regarding throwback jersey)

References

Flags of cities in Pennsylvania
Flag
Swedish-American culture
1895 introductions
1895 establishments in Pennsylvania
Flags introduced in 1895